Iwo Robert Waclaw Lominski FRSE (1905-1968) was a Polish-born microbiologist working in Britain in the 20th century. In articles he is referred to as I. R. W. Lominski.

Life

He was born in Krakow in south-west Poland in 1905. He studied medicine at the University of Krakow and gained his doctorate (MD) in 1931. He obtained a prestigious position in the Pasteur Institute in Paris.

At the outbreak of the Second World War he joined Polish forces fighting in France but was invalided out in 1940. In 1941 he went to Britain and obtained a Carnegie Teaching Fellowship at Glasgow University. In 1948 he also took on a role of senior consultant at Glasgow Western Infirmary. In 1963 he was awarded an honorary doctorate (DSc) by the university and in 1966 he was created professor of microbiology.

In 1958 he was elected a fellow of the Royal Society of Edinburgh. His proposers were Carl Hamilton Browning, John Walton, Norman Davidson, and John Monteath Robertson.

He died on 19 October 1968 aged only 63. In 1997 the "Iwo Lominski Bursary" was created by Glasgow University in his memory.

References

1905 births
1968 deaths
Physicians from Kraków
Academics of the University of Glasgow
Fellows of the Royal Society of Edinburgh
Polish microbiologists
Polish soldiers
Polish emigrants to the United Kingdom